Nembro is a comune (municipality) in the Province of Bergamo in the Italian region of Lombardy, located about  northeast of Milan and about  northeast of Bergamo, on the right bank of the Serio River. 

Nembro borders the following municipalities: Albino, Algua, Alzano Lombardo, Pradalunga, Scanzorosciate, Selvino, Villa di Serio, Zogno.

Place of religious interest 
 Nembro has covered since the fifth century. A.D. a notable religious importance. The Pleban Archpresbyteral church dedicated to San Martino bishop of Tours is proof of this. It was built in 1424 but completely modified between 1752 and 1777 by the architect Luca Lucchini of Certenago and is considered the largest church in the diocese of Bergamo.

Worthy of note are the stairs, the railings and the steps leading to the large crypt. Finally we find the tombs of the pleban archpriests and priests who died before the year 1805. They are located near the presbyterial crypt. Please note the decorations (1896) and the fresco "Martirio di San Bonifacio" (1906) made for the archpriest, by the artists Nicola and Luigi Savoldi.

Into the nature 
Concerning the naturalistic environment Nembro is full of paths on its municipal territory. Among these it is worth mentioning the path that reaches the Sanctuary of Zuccarello, reaching the Lonno hamlet. There are numerous paths that reach the surrounding mountains, including Cereto, Valtrosa, Podona and the villages of Selvino and Salmezza.

Covid pandemic 
Before the pandemic, the cemetery of Nembro was a small village cemetery under the mountains. It was so little known that hardly anyone would have been able to indicate on the map: One hundred eighty-eight dead, ninety-four in the first fifteen days of the virus.  The data worthy of note are the mortality rate which increased by 810% and increased by 1.63% compared to the population. 50% of the population has antibodies to the virus. Now the name of the town is associated with the failure to establish the "red zone" Alzano-Nembro. Both known and unknown people died. On average, each family has had a deceased person. there are also families who have had more than one loss (ex. Fam Lazzaroni).

Aid to the population activated 
Despite the situation, there is no shortage of stories to tell. Often the young people on the front line have been protagonists: they emerged as people with a great sense of responsibility and ready to help with their energies.

The actions were many and often the gestures seemed obvious but they were very important; how does distribution, house by house, of information material, the creation of a way to take care of children in the summer through the activities offered by the Oratory, the maintenance of the cemetery closed to the public and the offers of the population.

Some qualities of young people deserve to be mentioned. First of all, readiness: young people readily available without hesitation, the sense of responsibility and duty towards people, even strangers, and especially the sense of belonging to a community.

Mayor's reassurance 
The same mayor Cancelli was a victim of the covid, but fortunately he managed to recover after a month, on 1-3. He immediately thought of encouraging his citizens through a speech on zoom, summarized here.

«Dear citizens, The days seem and this seems unreal. There is the news, the ones we never wanted to hear. News that run in the messages communicated verbally. We have lost who was part of our history. We need to find the strength to face the next few days, which may still be difficult. We have to be strong. May everyone's strength be everyone's strength. See you tomorrow".

Main sights
Parish church of San Martino, erected in the 9th century but rebuilt in the 18th century. It houses 27 works by Enea Salmeggia.
Church of San Nicola da Tolentino (1512), with the annexed convent of the Augustinians. 
Sanctuary of the Zuccarello, built on the site of 15th-century castle, and housing frescoes from the 15th through 17th centuries.
Bridge on the Serio River (1591), in Romanesque style.
Casa Bonomi, built between the 15th and 18th century.
The Hunting lodge called "Canaletta", built in the 18th century.
wikimedia commons: File:Nembro piazza libertà.JPG

References

External links
 Official website